In computing, a Research Object is a method for the identification, aggregation and exchange of scholarly information on the Web. The primary goal of the research object approach is to provide a mechanism to associate related resources about a scientific investigation so that they can be shared using a single identifier. As such, research objects are an advanced form of Enhanced publication.

Current implementations build upon existing Web technologies and methods including Linked Data, HTTP, Uniform Resource Identifiers (URIs), the Open Archives Initiative Object Reuse and Exchange (OAI-ORE) and the Open Annotation model, as well as existing approaches for identification and knowledge representation in the scientific domain including Digital Object Identifiers for documents, ORCID identifiers for people, and the Investigation, Study, and Assay (ISA) data model.

Principles and motivation 
The research object approach is primarily motivated by a desire to improve reproducibility of scientific investigations. Central to the proposal is need to share research artifacts commonly distributed across specialist repositories on the Web including supporting data, software executables, source code, presentation slides, presentation videos. Research Objects are not one specific technology but are instead guided by a set of principles. Specifically research objects are guided by three principles of identity, aggregation and annotation

 Digital identity - Use unique identifiers as names for things, such as DOIs for publications or data, and ORCID ids for researchers.
 Data aggregation - Use some form of aggregation to associated related things together that are part of the broader study, investigation etc. so that others may more readily discover those related resources.
 Annotation - Provide additional metadata about those things, how they relate to each other, their provenance, how they were produced etc.

A number of communities are developing the research object concept.

ROSC W3C activity 
A W3C community group entitled the Research Objects for Scholarly Communication (ROSC) Community Group was started in April 2013. The community charter states that the goals of the ROSC activity are: "to exchange requirements and expectations for supporting a new form of scholarly communication"

The Community Group aims to produce the following types of deliverables:

 Use cases for the representation, publishing, and exchange of research objects on the Web
 Requirements and desiderata distilled from the use cases.
 A survey of related work on supporting the representation, publishing, and exchange of research objects.
 Various best practices and guidelines towards a community-wide practice of sharing, citing, and exchanging of research objects

FAIR digital objects 
The FAIR digital object forum is a community that brings together experts from the FAIR data movement, semantic web, and digital publishing of scholarly work. The first conference on FAIR digital objects led the coalition to ratify the Leiden Declaration  on FAIR digital objects. The principles contained in the Leiden Declaration provides a prescriptive framework for infrastructure development around digital research objects. This framework draws from the FAIR data principles and ideas around distributed infrastructure that relies on open protocols to prevent vendor lock-in and ensure access that is "as open as possible, as restricted as necessary".

Github and Figshare 
The Mozilla Science Lab have initiated an activity in collaboration with GitHub and Figshare to develop "Code as research object". The initial proposal of the activity is to allow users to transfer code from a GitHub repository to figshare, and provide that code with a Digital Object Identifier (DOI), providing a permanent record of the code that can be cited in future publications.

References

Scholarly communication
Information systems